Souvenirs, Souvenirs is a 1984 French comedy film directed by Ariel Zeitoun.

In 1985 Pierre-Loup Rajot won the César Award for Most Promising Actor for his performance in the film.

Cast 
 Christophe Malavoy - Rego Boccara / John B. Cutton
 Gabrielle Lazure - Hélène Demeuze
 Philippe Noiret - le proviseur
 Annie Girardot - Emma Boccara
 Jean Benguigui - Samuel
 Pierre-Loup Rajot - Antoine Boccara
 Marlène Jobert - Nadia
 Claude Brasseur - Firmani
 Philippe Laudenbach - Fressynet
 Catherine Jacob - The postmaster

References

External links 

1984 comedy films
1984 films
French comedy films
Films directed by Ariel Zeitoun
1980s French films